XHZH-FM is a radio station owned by the government of the Mexican state of Zacatecas. It is known as Radio Zacatecas and carries a cultural format.

Radio Zacatecas came to air in April 1984 and was reorganized into the Sistema Zacatecano de Radio y Televisión (Zacatecas Radio and Television System) with the sign-on of state-owned XHZHZ-TDT in February 2016.

References

Public radio in Mexico
Radio stations in Zacatecas
Zacatecas City